Blanquita Bird Valenti (1933 or 1934 – March 9, 2021) was an American politician from New Brunswick, New Jersey.

Biography 
Bird graduated from the Convent of the Sacred Heart in Connecticut and Rosemont College, Pennsylvania. In 1956 she married Thomas Valenti.  Mrs. Valenti also earned a master's degree in teaching from Seton Hall University and in Spanish and Latin American literature from Rutgers University. In 1971, she was appointed to the New Brunswick Board of Education, the first Latina in the state to serve in such a role.

In 1990, she was appointed to the New Brunswick City Council to fill a vacancy, subsequently being re-elected five times, including holding the office of Council President and Vice-President. In 2004, Valenti was elected to the Middlesex County Board of Chosen Freeholders (now Commissioners), serving five terms until her retirement in 2019.

She was honored for her works at her 15th anniversary. Valenti was the first Latina to serve in those two positions. After announcing her retirement, she retired in 2019.

Valenti died on March 9, 2021, aged 87. Politicians from the senate expressed their condolences. She was buried at St. Peter's Cemetery in New Brunswick.

References

1930s births
2021 deaths
20th-century American politicians
Women city councillors in New Jersey
Year of birth uncertain
Place of birth missing
Place of death missing
Politicians from New Brunswick, New Jersey
People from Santurce, Puerto Rico
Rutgers University alumni
Seton Hall University alumni
20th-century American women politicians
21st-century American politicians
21st-century American women politicians